{{Infobox automobile
| name = Peugeot Pars (X9)
| aka = Peugeot PersiaPeugeot SafirPeugeot Khazar 406 (Azerbaijan)
| image = Peugeot Pars.jpg
| manufacturer = Iran Khodro - Peugeot
| class = Large family car (D)
| body_style = 4-door sedan
| engine = 1.8L XU7 8V I4

1.8L XU7 JP4 16V I4

1.6L TU5 JP4 16V I4

1.8L XU7+ 8V I4

1.9L XUM 8V I4||
| production = 2001–present
| assembly = Cairo, Egypt (AAV) (2008-2015)Tehran, Iran (1999-present)Thiès, Senegal (SenIran), (2012-present)Neftchala, Azerbaijan (Khazar) (2019-present)
Iraq,(Iran Khodro), (2012-present)
| platform = Peugeot 405
| layout = FF layout
| related = Peugeot 405Peugeot 406Citroën Xantia
| predecessor = Peugeot 405Peugeot 406
}}

The Peugeot Pars, also known as Peugeot Persia, is a passenger car produced by the Iranian carmaker Iran Khodro. After 10 years of manufacturing the Peugeot 405 in Iran, the company designed the Peugeot Persia as its facelift, with a front end similar to that of the Peugeot 406 (and the Peugeot 605). The Peugeot Persia was soon renamed Peugeot Safir and eventually Peugeot Pars'' because of local copyright problems. The Peugeot Pars has been made in multiple variants. The 16V, ELX and LX models use more powerful PSA 16-valve engines and a few other improvements.

Interior
In 2014, Iran Khodro revamped the dashboard of the car.
In 2021, Iran Khodro removed the side light and placed that on Mirrors

Engines
The following variants are, or were,  available:
Pars (XU7 L3 engine, 8V) - gasoline or dual fuel (CNG/gasoline)
Pars LX and Pars automatic (TU5 engine, 16V)
Pars 16V and Pars ELX (XU7 L4 engine, 16 V)
Pars ELX XUM (XUM engine, 8V)

Peugeot Pars (basic model) 

The PSA-borrowed engine is XU7JP (code LFZ, known as L3 in Iran) 1.8 L SOHC with two valves per cylinder capable of producing a maximum power of 101 PS (74 kW) at 6000 rpm and a maximum torque of 153 Nm (15.6 kgf m / 113 ft·lbf) at 3000 rpm which is controlled by the SAGEM SL96 ECU. The same engine was already in use in various PSA Peugeot Citroën passenger cars.

Peugeot Pars LX

This version uses a 1.6 L, 16-valve engine. The PSA-borrowed engine is TU5JP4 (code NFU, known as TU5 in Iran)  DOHC with 4 valves per cylinder capable of producing a maximum power of 109 PS (80 kW) at 5800 rpm and a maximum torque of 142 Nm (14.47 kgf m / 104.73 ft·lbf) at 4000 rpm which is controlled by a Crouse or Bosch ECU. The same engine was already in use in the PSA's Peugeot 206 1.6 16v TU5 and Peugeot 405 SLX 1.6 16v TU5, and in the Runna 1.6 16v TU5.

Peugeot Pars ELX (2005-2014)

The upmarket version named ELX features smart instrument cluster, multi-purpose Persian-reading dashboard telematics, alarm with door auto-lock, park assistant, electric Recaro cloth seats equipped with heater/cooling fan, luxury dashboard trim, passenger illuminated vanity mirror, 4-disc brakes with ABS/EBD, and finally rally alloy wheels.

The PSA-borrowed engine is XU7JP4 (code LFY, known as L4 in Iran) 1.8 L 16-valve DOHC with 4 hydraulically adjusted valves per cylinder capable of producing a maximum power of 109.0 bhp (81.3 kW / 110.5 PS) at 5500 rpm and a maximum torque of 155.0 N·m (15.8 kgf·m / 114 ft·lbf) at 4250 rpm which is controlled by Bosch Motronic MP 7.3 ECU. The same engine was already in use in the PSA's Peugeot 406 LX 1.8i 16v, Citroën Xantia SX 1.8i 16v, and Citroën Xsara VTS 1.8i 16v

Peugeot Pars 16V

Not as equipped as ELX, this model was simply an upgraded version of Pars in aspects of engine and rear brakes. The 16V employed a more powerful 16 valve engine, and rear disc brakes, but ABS was not available even as an option. The 16V model's production lasted less than a year; began on the second quarter of 2003 and ended on the first quarter of 2004 (making them 1382 model year based on Persian calendar), the same time it was replaced with the ELX model.

The Iran Khodro website contradicts this information, saying that a non-ELX 16V variant was still produced in 2009 (and with drum brakes in the rear).

Many Iranian car industry critics believe its production was a case study of the Iranian car market capacity performed by Iran Khodro before beginning the production of ELX to see if people are interested in more powerful and luxurious versions of Pars.

As an improvement over the Pars, the 16V utilizes solid disc brakes on rear wheels, but unlike the ELX which is equipped with an advanced ABS/EBD, the 16V model uses the same vacuum booster, master cylinder, distributor, and hydraulic lines in its braking system as the standard Pars.

The more powerful LFY engine (later used on the ELX) fitted to the 16V models grabbed the interest of the authorities who are always seeking for high-performance yet inexpensive cars as service vehicles. A large number of 16Vs were produced according to requests registered by Iranian governmental organizations. 16Vs can be seen as parliament service cars and also motorcade escorts.

Peugeot Pars ELX XUM (2013-2017)

This model had an 8-valve, 1905 cc XUM engine. It was equipped with disc brakes in the front and in the rear, ABS (with EBD), plus ventilated disc brakes at the front wheels.

This model had options including indicator lights on wing mirrors.

References

External links

Iran Khodro official website

Cars of Iran
Front-wheel-drive vehicles
Sedans
2000s cars
Pars